Jazireh-ye Shif (also Romanized as Jazīreh-ye Shīf; also known as Shaft and Shīf) is a village  and island in Howmeh Rural District, in the Central District of Bushehr County, Bushehr Province, Iran. At the 2011 census, its population was 4200, in 521 families.

References 

Populated places in Bushehr County
Shif